Bloodfist II is a 1990 American martial arts action film directed by Andy Blumenthal and starring Don "The Dragon" Wilson, Kris Aguilar, and Ronald Asinas. It was written by Catherine Cyran.

Plot
The film opens with Jake Raye as he fights Mickey Sheehan in a pro-kickboxing bout. The movie opens as they enter the fifth Round of the Lightweight Championship Match. Jake delivers Mickey a lightning fast kick to the throat in the middle of the sixth round, instantly killing him. Seeing what he had done, he decides to give up kickboxing once and for all.

A year later, a friend and manager Vinny Petrello (Kickboxing and UFC champion Maurice Smith) asks him for a favor to travel to Manila and bail him out of trouble with a guy named Su. Although Jake's evening with a prostitute (Liza David) is interrupted, he agrees to help his friend in need.  Jake Raye travels to Manila, and meets up with local fighters John Jones (James Warring), Sal Taylor (Timothy D. Baker), Manny Rivera (Manny Samson), and Tobo Casenerra (Monsour Del Rosario). He also meets up with Dieter (Robert Marius), the head of the Dojo. Thugs attack Jake, who is helped by a woman named Mariella (Rina Reyes) into an abandoned safehouse. Mariella betrays him, and the thugs enter the safehouse. Dieter drugs Raye, and puts him on the ship with the other fighters. Raye is re-acquained with his friend Bobby Rose (Rick Hill) and meets another fighter named Ernesto (Steve Rodgers). It is revealed that Su (Joe Mari Avellana) is the one who bring the fighters to his island home called Paradise, and it is also revealed that Vinny is helping Su get the fighters there to battle in gladiator matches.

The fighters briefly rebel giving Jake Raye time to escape. Soon Raye has a change of heart and decides to free the other fighters. He makes it back to the house undetected by Su, and is helped once more by Mariella. Mariella and Raye uncover a plot for Su to give anabolic steroids to each of his fighters before the match.

Jake Raye takes out some guards before he is discovered by Dieter and knocked unconscious by Vinny, pretending to be in trouble. Jake is taken to the challenger’s box of the arena, where Su, Vinny, and his guests are awaiting the match's beginning. Both John and Ernest die in the arena while battling their opponents while Manny is killed trying to escape. (Ernest does win his fight, but Su orders Vinny to kill him either due to his unorthodox fighting--i.e. low blows and eye gouging although the fights were not fair to begin with and they were fighting for survival--or his embarrassment of Su's fighter). With the help of Mariella and the surviving fighters (Bobby, Sal, and Tobo). Jake fights and kills Vinny while the others defeat the guards and the elite fighters. Bobby shoots Dieter while escaping, and the film ends after Jake defeats Su with a swift kick off the balcony. The five people begin to walk off Paradise forever.

Cast
Don "The Dragon" Wilson as Jake Raye
Rina Reyes as Mariella
Jose Mari Avellana as Su
Robert Marius as Dieter
Maurice Smith as Vinny Petrello
Timothy D. Baker as Sal Taylor
James Warring as John Jones

Release
Bloodfist II received a limited release theatrically from Concorde Films in October 1990.  It ended up grossing $1,292,323 at the box office.

New Concorde Home Entertainment released the film on DVD in 2000 along with Bloodfist, Bloodfist III: Forced to Fight, and Bloodfist IV: Die Trying.  The DVD is currently out-of-print.

References

External links

 

1990 films
1990 action films
American action films
1990s English-language films
Bloodfist films
American independent films
American martial arts films
American sequel films
Kickboxing films
1990 martial arts films
1990 independent films
1990s American films